

Australia
A number of Australian state governments have adopted systematic programmes based on the Private Finance Initiative. The first, and the model for most others, is Partnerships Victoria. While some PPP projects have proceeded smoothly, others have been highly controversial. Australian examples include the Airport Link, the Cross City Tunnel, and the Sydney Harbour Tunnel, all in Sydney; the Southern Cross station redevelopment in Melbourne; and the Robina hospital in Queensland.

In the 2010s, the States of New South Wales, Queensland and Victoria implemented policies to encourage market-led proposals, where potential private partners can pitch PS projects for consideration by the government.

Bangladesh 

In Bangladesh, the Infrastructure Investment Facilitation Center facilitates private sector investment. As a result of their efforts, the telecom sector has become a very active private investment area.

Canada

In Canada, public–private partnerships have become significant in both social and infrastructure development. PPP Canada Inc. was created as a Crown corporation with an independent board of directors reporting through the Minister of Finance to Parliament. Its mandate is to improve the delivery of public infrastructure by achieving better value, timeliness and accountability to taxpayers, through P3s. The Corporation became operational in February 2009 with the appointments of a chair of the board of directors and a chief executive officer.

PPPs exist in a variety of forms in British Columbia through the focused efforts of Partnerships BC, a company registered under the Business Corporations Act, that is wholly owned by the Province of British Columbia and reports to its shareholder the Minister of Finance. Projects include the Canada Line rapid transit line, the Abbotsford Hospital and Cancer Centre and the Sea-to-Sky Highway project. In Quebec, PPPs include the McGill University Health Centre, the new western extension of Autoroute 30 and Université de Montréal's Hospital Research Center.

China
There are more than 14,000 existing P3 projects in China, totaling $2.7 trillion in aggregate value, according to the finance ministry.

The municipal government of Shantou, China signed a 50-billion RMB PPP agreement with the CITIC group to develop a massive residential project spanning an area of 168 square kilometers, locating on the southern district of the city's central business district. The project includes real estate development, infrastructure construction including a cross-harbor tunnel, and industry developments. The project, named Shantou Coastal New Town, aims itself to be a high-end cultural, leisure, business hub of the East Guangdong area.

European Union
The European Commission sees Investments in public-sector infrastructure are seen as an important means of maintaining economic activity. As a result of this increase in the role played by PPPs in new public-sector infrastructure projects and the complexity of PPP contracts, the European PPP Expertise Centre (EPEC) was established to support the public sector's capacity to implement PPPs and help overcome problems common across Europe in PPPs.

From 1990 to 2009, nearly 1,400 PPP deals were signed in the European Union, representing a capital value of approximately €260 billion. On the onset of the financial crisis in 2008, estimates suggest that the number of PPP deals closed has fallen more than 40 percent that year.

A study, conducted by the European Court of Auditors of the European Union, examined 12 public-private partnerships in France, Greece, Ireland and Spain, in road transport and information and communications technology. It concluded that the partnerships were characterized by "widespread shortcomings and limited benefits" and  underlined "considerable inefficiencies in the
form of delays during construction and major cost increases".

Greece 
The Greek Inter-Ministerial PPP Committee authorized two Public-Private Partnership projects in September 2017 and October 2018, including eight schools in the Cretan Municipality of Chania and 13 schools on the island of Rhodes.

Netherlands
The Netherlands Financial Sector Development Exchange (NFX) is a platform of ING, Rabobank, ABN AMRO, Fortis, Triodos Bank, FMO (Dutch development bank) and the Dutch Ministries of Foreign Affairs, Economic Affairs and Finance to stimulate financial sector development in developing countries and emerging markets.

Poland 
In July 2017, the Polish Council of Ministers approved the Policy for the Development of Public-Private Partnerships. In 2019, the Ministry offered public authorities with information and guidance on public-private partnerships. Poland is developing PPP Guidelines, following the path of the UK and other nations burdened by PPPs. In September 2018, the first installment on PPP Project Preparation was released.

Spain

In his paper on P3s in Spain, José Francisco Bellod Redondo notes that one of the main drivers for PFI in Spain is compliance with the fiscal restrictions imposed under the Maastricht Treaty and Stability and Growth Pact, which set concrete limits to the national debt. Examples of PFI projects in Spain include Parque de Valdebebas in Madrid, Ciutat de la Justicia in Barcelona, the Autovia de Noroeste in Murcia, and the Hospital Puerta de Hierro in Majadahonda.

India

The Government of India defines a P3 as "a partnership between a public sector entity (sponsoring authority) and a private sector entity (a legal entity in which 51% or more of equity is with the private partner/s) for the creation and/or management of infrastructure for public purpose for a specified period of time (concession period) on commercial terms and in which the private partner has been procured through a transparent and open procurement system."

The union government has estimated an investment of $320 billion in infrastructure in the 10th plan.  The major infrastructure development projects in the Indian state of Maharashtra (more than 50%) are based on the P3 model. In the 2000s, other states such as Karnataka, Madhya Pradesh, Gujarat and Tamil Nadu also adopted this model.  Sector-wise, road projects account for about 53.4% of the total projects in numbers, and 46% in terms of value. Ports come in second place and account for 8% of the total projects (21% of the total value).  Other sectors including power, irrigation, telecommunication, water supply and airports, have gained momentum through the P3 model. , these sectors were expected to get an investment of Rs. 2,027,169 crore (according to 2006–2007 WPI). Recent failures of the major PPPs in India, such as the Tata Mundra Ultra Mega Power Project and the Khandwa Water Supply Augmentation Project, are now questioning the ability of PPPs to deliver on the Sustainable Development Goals.

In India, public–private partnerships have been extremely successful in developing infrastructure, particularly road assets under the National Highways Authority of India and Midday Meal Scheme with Akshaya Patra Foundation.

Japan
In Japan since the 1980s, the  refers to joint corporations invested in by both public and private sectors.

In rail transport terms, a third-sector railway line is a short line or network of lines operated by a small operating company jointly owned by a prefectural/municipal government and smaller private interests. Third-sector lines are generally former JR Group – or, before 1987, Japanese National Railways (JNR) –lines that have been divested from those larger companies. Most third-sector railway lines in Japan, especially those located in rural areas, operate in a somewhat similar fashion to that of Community rail in the United Kingdom.

Pakistan

The PPP model developed in Pakistan is built around this approach, structured to provide a parallel alternatives to traditional healthcare using corporate infrastructures which has been packaged as corporate social responsibility.

Philippines
The Philippine Government (Filipino ) maintains an online list of PPP projects. Wikipedia articles on specific PPP projects in the Philippines are categorized into :Category:Proposed infrastructure in the Philippines.

The Philippine BOT Law has been passed on May 5, 1994 and had been subsequently amended in 2012

Russia
Nowadays there are special laws about PPP in 69 subjects of Russian Federation. But the biggest part of them are just declarations. Besides PPP in Russia is also regulated by Federal Law #115-FZ (21.07.2005) "On concessional agreements" and Federal Law #94-FZ (21.07.2005) "On Procurement of Goods, Works and Services for State and Municipal Needs". In some ways PPP is also regulated by Federal Law №116-FZ (22.07.2005) "On special economic zones" (in terms of providing business benefits on special territories – in the broadest sense it is a variation of PPP).

Still all those laws and documents do not cover all possible PPP forms.

In February 2013 experts rated subjects of Russian Federation according to their preparedness for implementing projects via public–private partnership. The most developed region was Saint Petersburg (with rating 7.8), the least Chukotka (rating 0.0).

By 2013 there were almost 300 public–private partnership projects in Russia.

United Kingdom

In 1992, the Conservative government of John Major in the UK introduced the PFI, the first systematic program aimed at encouraging public-private partnerships. The 1992 program focused on reducing the public-sector borrowing requirement, although, as already noted, the effect on public accounts was largely illusory. The Labour government of Tony Blair, elected in 1997, expanded the PFI initiative but sought to shift the emphasis to the achievement of "value for money", mainly through an appropriate allocation of risk. However, it has since been found that many programs ran dramatically over budget and have not provided value for money for the taxpayer, with some projects costing more to cancel than to complete. An in-depth study conducted by the National Audit Office of the United Kingdom concluded that the private finance initiative model had proved to be more expensive and less efficient in supporting hospitals, schools, and other public infrastructure than public financing.

In the UK, two-thirds of the London Underground PPP was taken back into public control in July 2007 after only four and a half years at an estimated cost of £2 billion and the remaining one-third was taken back into public control in May 2010 after seven and a half years for a purchase price of £310 million. The government had paid advisers £180 million for structuring, negotiating and implementing the PPP and had reimbursed £275 million of bid costs to the winning bidders. The 30-year PPP contract for the refurbishment of the MOD Main Building in London was estimated to give a saving of £100,000 as compared to the £746.2 million cost of public procurement. The refinancing of the Fazakerley Prison PFI contract following the completion of construction delivered an 81% gain to the private sector operator. The NATS PPP saw 51% of the UK's air traffic control service transferred to the private sector; however, following the decline in air traffic after the September 11 attacks, the government and BAA Limited each invested £65 million in the private sector operator in 2003.

United States

Public-private partnerships in America have existed in one form of another since the beginning of the colonial period, as colonial charters were based on a partnership between the British Crown and a company responsible for colonisation. In the United States, they mostly took the form of toll roads concessions, which emerged in the mid to late nineteenth century.

In recent years, there has been interest in expanding P3s to multiple infrastructure projects, such as schools, universities, government buildings, waste and water. In the early 2000s, P3s were implemented sporadically by different States and municipalities with little federal guidance. However, during Obama's second term, multiple policies were adopted to facilitate P3 projects, and Congress passed bills in that direction with overwhelming bipartisan support.

Vietnam 

P3s were introduced in Vietnam in 2010, with the goal of attracting private investments for the country's infrastructure projects. This development was encouraged by the World Bank. By 2016, Vietnam had introduced 101 P3 projects, totaling 18.5$ Billion dollars. In 2019, Vietnam adopted its first P3 law, which was rafted in collaboration with the United States Agency for International Development (USAID).

PPP units by country

References

Public–private partnership